Gregory, Greg or Gregg Lee may refer to:

People

Sportspeople
Greg Lee (defensive back) (born 1965), American football player 
Greg Lee (wide receiver) (born 1984), American football player 
Greg Lee (basketball) (1951–2022), American basketball and volleyball player

Other people
Greg Lee (actor) (born 1962), American actor
Gregory B. Lee (born 1955), academic, author, and broadcaster
Greg Lee, president of Nokia Technologies
Greg Lee, director of SEO DRUM Agency

Fictional characters
Gregg Lee, a character in video game Night in the Woods

See also
Greg Leigh (born 1994), Jamaican-British footballer
Craig Lee (born 1977), Scottish golfer
Lee Gregory (disambiguation)